Korsze  is a town in Kętrzyn County, Warmian-Masurian Voivodeship, Poland, with 4,724 inhabitants (2004). It is a railroad junction, located along the major Olsztyn - Skandawa line and Ełk-Bartoszyce line.

Krzysztof Raczkowski, the former musician and drummer for the Polish death metal band Vader, spent his juvenile years in Korsze. After his death, he was buried in the local cemetery.

Cities and towns in Warmian-Masurian Voivodeship
Kętrzyn County